Charltona plurivittalis is a moth in the family Crambidae. It was described by George Hampson in 1910. It is found in the Democratic Republic of the Congo and Zimbabwe.

References

Crambinae
Moths described in 1910
Taxa named by George Hampson